Cristispira is a genus of bacteria of the spirochete phylum. They are known as large spirochetes. They are characterized by the host species in which they reside. They are known as harmless parasites of freshwater and marine molluscs and gastropods. They have unusually large number of periplasmic flagella.

Morphology
They are differentiated from other spirochetes by the presence of a crestlike structure called the crista. Their cell bodies are flexible. The cell diameter is 28 to 120 micrometers. They are actively motile.

See also
 List of bacterial orders
 List of bacteria genera

References 

Spirochaetes
Bacteria genera